The Canopus-class ships of the line were a class of nine 84-gun two-deck second rates of the Royal Navy. Their design was based on an enlarged version of the lines of the captured French ship Franklin, since commissioned in the Royal Navy as HMS Canopus, although this ship herself was not included as a member of the class. The earlier ships were initially ordered as 80-gun third rates, but this classification was altered by changes in the rating system in February 1817. This class of ships is sometimes referred to as the ''Formidable'' class.

Ships

 
Builder: Chatham Dockyard
Ordered: 8 May 1815
Launched: 19 May 1825
Fate: Sold, 1906

 
Builder: Bombay Dockyard
Ordered: 4 June 1816
Launched: 10 November 1821
Fate: Sold, 1929

 
Builder: Bombay Dockyard
Ordered: 22 April 1819
Launched: 19 January 1824
Fate: Sold, 1908

 
Builder: Pembroke Dockyard
Ordered: 23 January 1817
Launched: 27 July 1824
Fate: Sold, 1897

 
Builder: Chatham Dockyard
Ordered: 23 January 1817
Launched: 21 June 1826
Fate: Broken up, 1864

 
Builder: Pembroke Dockyard
Ordered: 27 May 1819
Launched: 25 July 1827
Fate: Burnt, 1884

 
Builder: Bombay Dockyard
Ordered: 26 January 1825
Launched: 17 February 1828
Fate: Burnt, 1864

 
Builder: Woolwich Dockyard
Ordered: 23 January 1817
Launched: 22 September 1831
Fate: Sold, 1901

 
Builder: Chatham Dockyard
Ordered: 23 July 1817
Launched: 18 December 1832
Fate: Broken up, 1866

References

 
 

 
Ship of the line classes